The 418th Flight Test Squadron is a United States Air Force squadron.  It is assigned to the 412th Operations Group, Air Force Materiel Command, stationed at Edwards Air Force Base, California.

The first predecessor of the squadron was activated during World War II as a heavy bomber unit.  It served in combat in the European Theater of Operations, where it earned a Distinguished Unit Citation and the French Croix de Guerre with Palm for its actions.  After V-E Day the squadron returned to the United States and was inactivated at the port of embarkation.

The squadron was briefly active in the reserve from 1947 to 1949, but does not appear to have been fully equipped or assigned enough aircrew.  It served from 1959 to 1962 as a Boeing B-47 Stratojet squadron in Strategic Air Command.

The second predecessor of the squadron was activated in 1989 as the 6518th Test Squadron.  The two squadrons were consolidated in 1992 as the 418th Test Squadron and have served in the flight test role.

Mission
The 418th performs flight testing on the C-5, C-17, KC-10, KC-46, KC-135, and partner nation airlift and air refueling aircraft.

History

World War II
Established as a Boeing B-17 Flying Fortress reconnaissance squadron in January 1942; redesignated as a heavy bomber squadron in April and activated in June.   Trained initially under Third Air Force in the southeast; transferring to Second Air Force in the Pacific Northwest.  Operated as an Operational Training Unit in the Midwest until being deployed to the European Theater of Operations, being assigned to VIII Bomber Command in England in June 1942.

Engaged in strategic bombardment operations over Occupied Europe and Germany, sustaining very heavy losses of personnel and aircraft while conducting many unescorted missions over enemy territory attacking airfields, industries, naval facilities and transportation hubs.   During the summer of 1944, aircrews bombed enemy positions at Saint-Lô, followed by similar campaigns at Brest, France in August and September. In October 1944, the squadron attacked enemy and ground defenses in the allied drive on the Siegfried Line, then bombed marshaling yards, German occupied villages, and communication targets in the Ardennes during the Battle of the Bulge from December 1944 to January 1945.  Attacked enemy targets in Germany during the spring of 1945, ending combat operations with the German Capitulation in May 1945.

Remained in Europe as part of the United States Air Forces in Europe occupation forces, dropping food to the people in the west of the Netherlands, and in June transported French Allied former prisoners of war from Austria to France. Demobilizing in England, in December 1945 the squadron inactivated as a paper unit.

Air Force Reserve
Activated in the Air Force Reserve in 1947 at Miami Airport, Florida.  Unclear whether or not the unit was fully crewed or equipped; inactivated in 1949 due to budget restrictions.

Strategic Air Command
From 1958, the Boeing B-47 Stratojet wings of Strategic Air Command (SAC) began to assume an alert posture at their home bases, reducing the amount of time spent on alert at overseas bases.  The SAC alert cycle divided itself into four parts: planning, flying, alert and rest to meet General Thomas S. Power's initial goal of maintaining one third of SAC’s planes on fifteen minute ground alert, fully fueled and ready for combat to reduce vulnerability to a Soviet missile strike. To implement this new system B-47 wings reorganized from three to four squadrons. The 418th was activated at Pease Air Force Base as the fourth squadron of the 100th Bombardment Wing.  The alert commitment was increased to half the squadron's aircraft in 1962 and the four squadron pattern no longer met the alert cycle commitment, so the squadron was inactivated on 1 January 1962.

Flight Test Squadron
Reactivated as a flight testing squadron at Edwards Air Force Base, California. It has conducted flight testing of the MC-130H Combat Talon II and AC-130U Spooky aircraft since 1989.

Supported test programs for miscellaneous large aircraft (other than the Edwards-owned Boeing C-135 Stratolifter and Boeing C-137 Stratoliner fleets). Also managed small test programs including the Slingsby T-3 Firefly, Beechcraft T-6 Texan II, and Lockheed Martin C-130J Super Hercules. Gained the Boeing C-17A Globemaster III program from the inactivating 417th Flight Test Squadron in 1995. Added EC-18 and Boeing NKC-135 types from the 452d Flight Test Squadron in a realignment of Edwards flight test squadrons on 1 October 2000. Ceased operating the EC-18s on 24 August 2001 when they were retired.

Lineage
 418th Bombardment Squadron
 Constituted as the 28th Reconnaissance Squadron (Heavy) on 28 January 1942
 Redesignated 418th Bombardment Squadron (Heavy) on 22 April 1942
 Activated on 1 June 1942
 Redesignated 418th Bombardment Squadron, Heavy on 20 August 1943
 Inactivated on 19 December 1945
 Redesignated 418th Bombardment Squadron, Very Heavy on 13 May 1947
 Activated in the reserve on 29 May 1947
 Inactivated on 27 June 1949
 Redesignated 418th Bombardment Squadron, Medium on 1 December 1958
 Activated on 1 March 1959
 Discontinued and inactivated on 1 January 1962
 Consolidated with the 6518th Test Squadron as the 6518th Test Squadron on 1 October 1992

 418th Flight Test Squadron
 Designated as the 6518th Test Squadron and activated on 10 March 1989
 Consolidated with the 418th Bombardment Squadron on 1 October 1992
 Redesignated 418th Test Squadron on 2 October 1992
 Redesignated 418th Flight Test Squadron on 1 March 1994

Assignments
 100th Bombardment Group, 1 June 1942 – 19 December 1945
 100th Bombardment Group, 29 May 1947 – 27 June 1949
 100th Bombardment Wing, 1 March 1959 – 1 January 1962
 6510th Test Wing (later 412th Test Wing), 10 March 1989
 412th Operations Group, 1 October 1993 – present

Stations
 Orlando Army Air Base, Florida 1 June 1942
 Barksdale Field, Louisiana, c. 18 June 1942
 Pendleton Field, Oregon c. 26 June 1942
 Gowen Field, Idaho, 28 August 1942
 Walla Walla Army Air Field, Washington, c. 1 November 1942
 Wendover Field, Utah, c. 30 November 1942
 Sioux City Army Air Base, Iowa, c. 28 December 1942
 Kearney Army Air Field, Nebraska, c. 30 January – May 1943
 RAF Thorpe Abbotts (USAAF Station 139), England, 9 June 1943 – December 1945
 Camp Kilmer, New Jersey, c. 20–21 December 1945
 Miami Army Air Field, Florida, 29 May 1947 – 27 June 1949
 Pease Air Force Base, New Hampshire, 1 March 1959 – 30 April 1966
 Edwards Air Force Base, California, 10 Mar 1989–Present

Aircraft

 Boeing B-17 Flying Fortress, 1942–1945
 Boeing B-47 Stratojet, 1959–1961
 Lockheed MC-130H Hercules, 1989–1994
 Lockheed AC-130U Hercules, 1990–1995
 Lockheed C-141 Starlifter, 1993–1998
 Short C-23 Sherpa, 1993–1997
 North American T-39 Sabreliner, 1993–present
 Boeing C-17A Globemaster III, 1995–present
 Lockheed NC-130H Hercules, 1995–present
 Beechcraft C-12 Huron, 1997–present
 Bell Boeing CV-22 Osprey, 2000–present
 EC-18B Stratoliner, Oct 2000 – Aug 2001
 Boeing NKC-135E, 2000–2006
 Boeing KC-135R Stratotanker, 2000–present

See also

 List of United States Air Force test squadrons

References
 Notes

 Citations

Bibliography

 
 
 
 
 

418
Military units and formations in California